Talimorab is a village in Dharwad district of Karnataka, India.

Demographics 
As of the 2011 Census of India there were 320 households in Talimorab and a total population of 1,806 consisting of 929 males and 877 females. There were 224 children ages 0-6.

References

Villages in Dharwad district